A list of films produced in Italy in 1916 (see 1916 in film):

External links
 Italian films of 1916 at the Internet Movie Database

Italian
1916
Films